Clarksboro is an unincorporated community and historic area located in the municipality of East Greenwich Township in Gloucester County, in the U.S. state of New Jersey.

Education
East Greenwich Township School District serves grades K-6 with students in 7-12 served by Kingsway Regional School District. 

Guardian Angels Regional School is a K-8 school that operates under the auspices of the Roman Catholic Diocese of Camden. Its PreK-3 campus is in Gibbstown while its 4-8 campus is in Paulsboro.

Notable people

People who were born in, residents of, or otherwise closely associated with Clarksboro include:
 Danielson (1995–present), family indie rock band
 Rachel Davis DuBois (1892–1993), educator, human rights activist and pioneer of intercultural education.
 George Gill Green (1842–1925), patent medicine manufacturer
 Amos J. Peaslee (1887–1969), politician, military official, author, and diplomat who served as United States Ambassador to Australia
 Hardy Richardson (1855-1931), Major League Baseball player

Points of interest 
Eglington Cemetery
Hollingshead Airport

References

East Greenwich Township, New Jersey
Unincorporated communities in Gloucester County, New Jersey
Unincorporated communities in New Jersey